"Roses" is a song by Guyanese-American rapper Saint Jhn, originally released on July 22, 2016 and later included on his 2018 album Collection One. Originally produced by Fallen, it was remixed by Kazakh producer Imanbek and released as a single on September 18, 2019. The remix of the song helped the song gain international recognition after it was featured on a Snapchat filter and on video-sharing app TikTok where it received over 4.5 billion plays in the month of April 2020. On May 27, 2020, a second remix produced by Quay Global and Fallen was released with American rapper Future. On July 20, 2020, a music video was released for the second remix, despite initially being cancelled to help bail funds for arrested protesters and aid black-owned businesses and the Black Lives Matter movement, all regarding the George Floyd protests that started during May 2020.

On July 17, 2020, a second version of the Imanbek remix was released, featuring an extra verse by Jhn and a featured verse by Colombian singer J Balvin.

Production
A then-19-year-old Kazakh musician and producer, Imanbek, remixed the song in early 2019; it was officially released as a single in October 2019 through Effective Records, B1 Recordings and Godd Complexx/Hitco.

Commercial performance
Following the release of the Imanbek remix, "Roses" peaked at number four on the Billboard Hot 100. Outside of the United States, "Roses" topped the charts in Australia, Canada, Ireland, and the United Kingdom.

Awards and nominations

Charts

Weekly charts

Original or combined version

Imanbek remix

Monthly charts

Year-end charts

Certifications

See also
List of Airplay 100 number ones of the 2020s

References

2016 songs
2019 singles
Canadian Hot 100 number-one singles
Dutch Top 40 number-one singles
Imanbek songs
Irish Singles Chart number-one singles
Number-one singles in Australia
Number-one singles in Greece
Number-one singles in Romania
Number-one singles in New Zealand
Saint Jhn songs
UK Singles Chart number-one singles
Ultratop 50 Singles (Wallonia) number-one singles